Eduard Vasilyevich Shemyakov (born September 30, 1975), known as The Resort Maniac, is a Ukrainian-born Russian serial killer who killed 10 people and attempted to kill 2 others in St. Petersburg between 1996 and 1998. Before the murders, he always raped his victims, and always killed with particular cruelty, dismembering and decapitating bodies. In at least one case, cannibalism was involved.

Biography 
Shemyakov was born in 1975. After school he joined the army, and served with the border troops in the town of Kuvshinskaya Salma. According to some reports, he was bullied by senior officials while in the army. Upon returning home to St. Petersburg he worked as a security guard and was fond of computer equipment. In his private life, however, Shemyakov had problems such as experiencing frequent headaches and having trouble socializing with girls. He also lived with his parents.

After seeing the film "The Dawns Here Are Quiet", Shemyakov decided that he wanted to kill women. The film, most likely, had nothing to do with it, but it is believed that it influenced him through imprinting. Shemyakov committed all of his murders on the outskirts of St. Petersburg or outside the city, his youngest victim being 11 years old. In two cases, the assault did not end with murder - in the first case, Shemyakov was scared off by a passer-by, and in the second he released the victim voluntarily and asked her to inform the police of his deeds, probably realising the danger he posed. The killer was caught after killing his sister's girlfriend. Shemyakov's mother also found in her refrigerator a half-eaten piece of human meat. She called the police, and upon returning home Shemyakov was arrested by the police. Although he was warned by a neighbor about the ambush in his apartment, he said that he did not care and went right into the hands of the authorities.

Experts diagnosed Shemyakov with paranoid schizophrenia (he himself said that he was ordered to "kill the people and drown their heads" by "eyes in the water"). As a result, he was found insane and to compulsory treatment in a psychiatric hospital in 2002. Relatives of the victims repeatedly tried to appeal the court's decision, but the verdict has remained unchanged.

See also
 List of Russian serial killers
 List of serial killers by number of victims

References

External links 
 Eduard Vasilyevich Shemyakov

1975 births
Living people
Male serial killers
People acquitted by reason of insanity
People with schizophrenia
Russian cannibals
Russian murderers of children
Russian rapists
Russian serial killers
Violence against women in Russia